"Flow, my tears" (originally ) is a lute song (specifically, an "ayre") by the accomplished lutenist and composer John Dowland (1563–1626). Originally composed as an instrumental under the name "Lachrimae pavane" in 1596, it is Dowland's most famous ayre, and became his signature song, literally as well as metaphorically: he would occasionally sign his name "Jo: dolandi de Lachrimae".

Details

Like others of Dowland's lute songs, the piece's musical form and style are based on a dance, in this case the pavan. It was first published in The Second Booke of Songs or Ayres of 2, 4 and 5 parts (London, 1600). The song begins with a falling tear motif, starting on an A and descending to an E by step on the text "Flow, my tears". This may have been borrowed from an Orlande de Lassus motet or Luca Marenzio madrigal (this type of motif was common in Elizabethan music to signify grief), in addition to other borrowings in the piece. Anthony Boden calls the song "probably the most widely known English song of the early 17th century."

Variants

There have been many instrumental versions of this song, most entitled "Lachrimae" (or "Lachrymae", literally "tears"). In this case the instrumental version was written first, as "Lachrimae pavane" in 1596, and lyrics were later added. It is believed that the text was written specifically for the music, and may have been written by Dowland himself. The English musicologist Peter Holman claims that the first pavan of "Lachrimae" (called "Lachrimae Antiquae", or the "Old Tears") is "perhaps the single most popular and widely distributed instrumental piece of the period". According to Holman, it exists in around 100 manuscripts and printings across Europe including England, Scotland, The Netherlands, France, Germany, Austria, Denmark, Sweden, and Italy, in different arrangements for ensemble and solo. 

The "Lachrimae" tend to be much more abstract than later music (such as Bach and Chopin) and there is no "definitive" version of the piece. Dowland and his contemporaries supposedly played their own versions in a semi-improvised fashion, like jazz musicians today. Holman argues that the popularity of "Lachrimae" came from its rich melodic and motivic nature. Other English composers in the period generally gave only one or two ideas per strain and padded them out with dull, diffusive contrapuntal writing. In contrast, Dowland's "Lachrimae" provide a variety of strikingly melodic ideas and furthermore they are tightly and tactfully interconnected.

Instrumental versions by Dowland include "Lachrimae" for lute, "Galliard to Lachrimae" for lute and "Lachrimae antiquae" (1604) for consort. Dowland also published Lachrimae, or Seaven Teares (London, 1604), a collection of consort music which included a cycle of seven "Lachrimae" pavans based on the falling tear motif. Thomas Morley set the "Lachrimae Pauin" for the six instruments of a broken consort in his First Booke of Consort Lessons (London, 1599).

Other composers have written pieces based on the work, including Jan Pieterszoon Sweelinck, Thomas Tomkins, and Tobias Hume's What Greater Griefe, while John Danyel's Eyes, look no more pays clear homage to the piece, as does John Bennet's "Weep, o mine eyes". In the 20th century, American composer and conductor Victoria Bond wrote Old New Borrowed Blues (Variations on Flow my Tears). Benjamin Britten quotes the incipit of "Flow, my tears" in his Lachrymae for viola, a set of variations on Dowland's ayre "If my complaints could passions move". In 2006, the British electronic music group Banco de Gaia produced a vocoded version called "Flow my Dreams, the Android Wept".

Lyrics

In other media 
Lines 8–10 are quoted in the 1974 Philip K. Dick novel Flow My Tears, the Policeman Said, the title of which is also an allusion to the song.

Footnotes

Sources
 
  
  
 Dowland, John. Second Booke of Songs or Ayres (1600) Facsimile edition of the original manuscript M2DOW

Further reading
 Christopher Hogwood. Preface to Dowland: Keyboard music. Edition HH, Bicester, England, 2005. Accessed December 16, 2007. HH website.
 Peter Holman with Paul O'Dette. "John Dowland", Grove Music Online, ed. L. Macy

External links
 "Flow, my tears" by John Dowland, video of a performance by Valeria Mignaco, soprano, and Alfonso Marin, lute
 Sheet music for "Flow, my tears"
 "Flow, my tears" sung by countertenor Andreas Scholl
 

Compositions by John Dowland
Lute songs
1600 works
The Second Book of Songs